Tony Moynihan is a former association football player who represented New Zealand at international level. He also had a very successful club career as well. Playing first team football and 3 big clubs- Starting off at Crewe Alexandra, then moving up north to both Inverness clubs.

Moynihan played two official A-international matches for the New Zealand in 1960, both against Pacific minnows Tahiti, the first a 5–1 win on 5 September, the second a 2–1 win on 12 September 1960.

References 

Year of birth missing (living people)
Living people
New Zealand association footballers
New Zealand international footballers
Association footballers not categorized by position